The Wilbur Theatre is a historic performing arts theater at 244–250 Tremont Street in Boston, Massachusetts. The Wilbur Theatre originally opened in 1914, but underwent renovations in 2008. The Wilbur Theatre sits in the heart of Boston's historic theater district and is known for hosting live comedy and music.

The venue seats 1,093, but the main floor (orchestra level) has removable tables and seating, to create a general admission standing room (bringing capacity to 1,200). It features basic concessions, including a full bar, on each of the three floors (Orchestra, Mezzanine, Balcony).

History 
Clarence Blackall built the theater in 1913, and it was opened the following year. The Wilbur was listed on the National Register of Historic Places in 1980 and designated as a Boston Landmark by the Boston Landmarks Commission in 1987.

In 1998 SFX Entertainment (now Live Nation) bought the Boston theater properties of Jon B. Platt, which included the lease on the Wilbur. The lease ended in 2006.

In 2007 the theater was put on the market. Bill Blumenreich, a former owner of the Comedy Connection in Quincy Market, leased the building in 2008. The theater continues to regularly host comedic and musical acts, as well as other events.

Comedy specials 
The following specials were filmed at the Wilbur Theatre:

See also 

 National Register of Historic Places listings in northern Boston, Massachusetts

References

Further reading 
 Yearbook of the Boston Architectural Club, 1915. Includes illus. of Wilbur Theatre
 George McKinnon. "A born-again Wilbur will celebrate success." Boston Globe, 20 Jan 1980
 Anthony J. Yudis. "Theatre plaza to spotlight the district." Boston Globe, 09 Oct 1983

External links 
 Library of Congress. Drawing of Ye Wilbur Theatre, Tremont St. and Hollis St., Boston, Massachusetts, 1927.
 Boston Athenæum Theater History. Wilbur Theatre (1914–), 250–252 Tremont Street
 New York Public Library:
 Photo of interior, Wilbur Theatre, Boston, Mass., 20th century
 Program for the Wilbur Theatre, Boston (Oct. 1956)
 Bostonian Society:
 Photo of 244-272 Tremont Street, c. 1935
 Photo of 250-268 Tremont Street, c. 1959
 City of Boston, Landmarks Commission. Wilbur Theatre Study Report, 1983

Images 

Theatres completed in 1913
Theatres on the National Register of Historic Places in Massachusetts
Buildings and structures in Boston
Theatres in Boston
Boston Theater District
1914 establishments in Massachusetts
Event venues established in 1914
National Register of Historic Places in Boston
Landmarks in Boston